The 2014 ASEAN Basketball League Regular Season was the fifth season of competition of the ASEAN Basketball League (ABL). Hi-Tech Bangkok City won its second title in its franchise history after defeating Westports Malaysia Dragons in two games. Anthony Macri, the commissioner of the league for the past two years, resigned on 21 February 2014. The regular season began on 16 July 2014 and concluded on 26 October 2014. Two teams from the previous season, defending champions San Miguel Beermen and Sports Rev Thailand Slammers, did not return for the current season.

Teams

Standings

Results

Statistical leaders

Source:

Playoffs

The 2014 ABL Playoffs began on 29 October 2014.

Semi-finals
The semi-finals is a best-of-three series, with the higher seeded team hosting Game 1, and 3, if necessary.

|}

Finals
The Finals is a best-of-three series, with the higher seeded team hosting Game 1, and 3, if necessary.

|}

References

External links
 Official website

 
2014–15 in Asian basketball leagues
2014-15
2014–15 in Malaysian basketball
2014–15 in Indonesian basketball
2014–15 in Singaporean basketball
2014–15 in Thai basketball
2014–15 in Vietnamese basketball